Scandinavian Immigration to the Americas involves the immigration of people from Scandinavia to the Americas and its associated territories. Typically, Scandinavia refers to the countries of Sweden, Norway, Denmark, and sometimes other Nordic countries like Finland and Iceland. Individuals who immigrated to the Americas from Scandinavia brought with them cultural, economic, educational, and other valuable contributions.

Immigration to the United States by home country

Swedish immigration 
Swedish immigration into the Americas was primarily between the years of 1840 and 1930, where 1.3 million Swedes traveled to America. Between 1920 and 1930, 92,000 Swedes arrived in one of the last large migrations to the United States. Swedish Americans settled all over the United States, specifically in the Midwest areas near the Great Lakes, and Cuba.

Despite eventual successful integration with American culture and other nearby settlers, Swedes were able to maintain some of their national heritage through religious and social organizations. Swedish American newspapers were published in Illinois and Minnesota, the first of which named Hemlandet in 1855. Swedes in America were primarily agricultural farmers, factory workers, or furniture workers.

Swedish immigration to Delaware

New Sweden 

In the early 1600s, Swedish settlers attempted to join the colonization of the Delaware River region. Much of the initial effort was led by Peter Minuit, who established New Sweden in 1638 upon the building of Fort Kristina. This early settlement saw difficulty however, and never grew to its intended fruition, as ships travelling back and forth to Sweden malfunctioned and friction between colonizers of other nationalities arose. On one occasion, a party sent by Minuit was rejected trade agreement by the English at Jamestown. On another occasion, English colonizers were accused of bribing Native Americans to kill Swedish colonizers for the purpose of monopolizing the trade outlet for animal pelts.

In addition, the Dutch under the direction of Peter Stuyvesant destroyed parts of Swedish settlements and captured Swedish ships. The Dutch also restricted navigational efficiency on the Delaware for the Swedes by constructing a fort named Fort Casimir near Fort Kristina without warranted permission from the Swedes. Eventually in 1655, New Sweden was conquered by the Dutch. The growing number of Swedes in the present day eastern United States was kept at bay until centuries after New Sweden was established. One result of the Swede's difficulty in maintaining New Sweden was unusually good relations with the nearby Native American tribes. Because friends were so scarce in the Delaware River valley for the Swedes, they often had no choice but to trade with the Natives, necessitating a relationship of peace. Residents of New Sweden primarily grew and harvested tobacco for trade.

Swedish immigration to Minnesota 
The first Swedes on the United States Census in the Minnesota Territory were recorded in 1850. In April 1851, the first permanent Swedish settlement in Minnesota was established near Chisago Lake. Some of the more well known Swedish pioneers to this area include Erik Ulrick Norberg and Johan Oscar Roos. Intrigued by letters from family and friends, Swedes continued to move to the Chisago Lake area and quickly became a significant economic and political presence in the community.

An earlier immigration occurred in western Illinois at Bishop Hill in the 1840s.

Swedish immigration to Cuba 

Following the Spanish-American War, some Swedes saw an opportunity to settle in Cuba, which offered cheap land and fertile soil able to grow crops year-round. One of the first Swedish settlements in Cuba was led by Dr. Alfred Lind, who capitalized on the opportunity, advertising settlement in Cuba to Swedish immigrants on the United States mainland. Most of the Swedes who moved to Cuba came from Minnesota. Following Lind's efforts, a few additional Swedish colonies began to emerge and grow in Cuba, such as the Bayate settlement.

Many Swedes became tri-lingual as they learned English in the United States, spoke their native language among themselves in Cuba, and learned Spanish to communicate with the native Cubans. Many Swedes hired Cubans for farm work. The settlements began to diminish around 1917 due to many Swedes moving back to the United States because of the beginning of the first world war in Europe and the resultant unpredictability regarding the future state of Cuba as a whole. Today, little Swedish influence remains in Cuba.

Influences

Coffee 
Among the foundation of America's coffee drinking habits lies the influence of the Swedish Americans.  Swedish immigrants brought a love of good coffee with them to America. In Sweden, substitute forms of coffee were often the norm due to its difficulty to acquire, but opportunities in America allowed for coffee beans to be more easily accessed, and coffee drinking for Swedish Americans became very frequent. Along with the tradition of coffee drinking, the Swedes brought the tradition of enjoying a complementary treat with the coffee, such as cookies.

Gustavus Adolphus College 
Swedish American founded Gustavus Adolphus College in St. Peter, Minnesota is another evidence of the valuable contributions of Swedish immigrants to America. The college was established by Reverend Eric Norelius in Minnesota in 1862, and in 2020 ranked number 89 among the nation's best liberal arts colleges.

Religion 
Along with the Swedes came their devout religious practices to America. Many theologically versed Swedes, such as preachers, became an integral part of the communities to which they immigrated. Swedish Americans formed and led congregations, and though many shared an Episcopal background, they interacted heavily with other denominations, contributing to the societal benefits of religion.

Norwegian immigration 

Norwegian presence in the Americas began as Leif Erikson landed in New England around the year 1000. Erikson established a colony called Vinland, and Norwegians are believed to have traveled as far west as the Great Lakes at that time, as well as considerably far down the Eastern Coast. It was difficult to maintain these colonies due to the Norwegian relationship with Denmark. This allowed for Norwegian presence to disappear in the Americas until Christopher Columbus arrived in the hemisphere and subsequent later events in U.S. History. Norwegians reentered America during the colonizing period, and were prominent in Dutch colonies.

Norwegian immigration in the modern period was the second largest group to come to America, closely following the Swedes and occurring during relatively the same time period, around 1840–1930. Most Norwegians emigrated to America for economic reasons, although some also came for religious freedoms.  Generally, Norwegians settled in the Midwestern regions, close to the Great Lakes.

Leif Erikson's discovery of the Americas 
Leif Erikson is credited with discovering the Americas, naming each place he landed along the coast Helluland, Markland, and Vinland respectively. The exact locations of each landing site are unknown, but it generally believed by scholars to be along the eastern coast of Nova Scotia and modern day Canada. Archaeological evidence of Vikings has been found in North America, such as spun yarn, iron, and European style carvings. L'Anse aux Meadows in present-day Canada is the best known site of Viking presence in America.

Kleng Pedersen Hesthammer 
Kleng Pedersen Hesthammer is considered by many the first modern Norwegian to settle in America. Later known by the name Cleng Peerson, Peerson was sent to America by a group of Norwegian Quakers looking for a place to practice their religion. In 1821, Peerson arrived in New York, and there lived for three years, after which he returned to Norway. Peerson returned to America in 1825, and traveled throughout the Midwest, settling in Texas where he was buried. His gravestone reads, "Cleng Peerson, the first Norwegian Emigrant to America."

The Sloopers 
A group of 45 Norwegians, and a crew of seven seamen bought a slooper named Restoration in Stavanger, Norway and crossed the Atlantic Ocean to the United States. Their path was not a common route, as they chose to journey from Stavanger, to Funchal in Madiera, to New York. Upon arrival in New York, the passenger count had increased to 46 as a child had been born en route, and the ship was seized by the US government. The US Act of 1819 stated that the legal limit for passengers was 2 people for every 5 tons. before departure from Norway, the Restoration measured 39 tons, at the American port, the Restoration was registered at 60 tons. Even with higher tonnage, there were 21 passengers too many on the slooper. The Norwegian immigrants, called Sloopers, were fined $3,150 dollars in addition to the seizure of the ship. Due to the help of prominent New York Quakers such as Francis Thomas, the Sloopers were able to reclaim their slooper and were released from paying the fine by President John Quincy Adams and Secretary of State Henry Clay.  The Sloopers then continued on to settle in Kendall, New York.

Norwegian immigration to Wisconsin 
One the first large shiploads of Norwegian emigrants departed Norway on 17 May 1839. Upon arrival in the United States, immigrants immediately settled in Wisconsin. Large groups of Norwegians gathered in the areas of Milwaukee, Muskego, Jefferson and Rock Prairies, and Koshkonong.

Muskego, Wisconsin

Even Heg 
Even Heg was heavily involved in the settlement of Muskego. Widely regarded as an authority figure within the community, Heg's barn was used for both political and religious functions in the community, and Heg himself officiated in these meetings often. The barn was used temporarily as a schoolhouse, as well as printing press of the local newspaper.

First Norwegian Newspaper 
The First Norwegian language newspaper was published in Muskego on 29 July 1847, by James Denoon Reymert, Even Heg, and Søren Bache. Named the Nordlyset, the newspaper had the goal of educating Norwegian immigrants of politics both in America and in Norway. Reymert left the paper after a couple publications, and started a second newspaper in a neighboring town called the Democraten. The Nordlyset and Democraten were combined and published together in Racine, WI.

First Norwegian Church 
The first constructed Norwegian Church was built on top of a hill in Muskego. Built in 1843, it was composed of Walnut and Oak. In 1869, the building was removed, and is now restored for viewing at a Lutheran Seminary in Minneapolis. The current Norwegian Muskego church is located in the same location.

Danish immigration 

The Danes were the smallest group of Scandinavian immigrants to come to America, however there are several US names that point to Danish influence. Peter Lassen gave his name to several landmarks in California.

References 

Immigration to North America
Swedish emigrants to the United States